The De Vargas Street House, often referred to as the Oldest House, is a historic building in Santa Fe, New Mexico, which is often said to be one of the oldest buildings in United States. The original date of construction is unknown but the majority of the building is believed to date to the Spanish colonial period (post-1610). One archaeological study also concluded that some sections of the walls are characteristic of Pueblo architecture and may be pre-Spanish in origin. The building was listed on the National Register of Historic Places and New Mexico State Register of Cultural Properties in 1968 as a contributing property in the Barrio De Analco Historic District.

History
The Barrio de Analco, across the Santa Fe River from the main settlement around Santa Fe Plaza, was established in the early 1600s by various working-class inhabitants, including some Tlaxcaltec people who had accompanied the Spanish settlers from Mexico. The name "Analco" came from the Nahuatl language, meaning "on the other side of the river". The nucleus of the settlement was the San Miguel Mission, built around 1620. According to noted archaeologist Edgar Lee Hewett, the Barrio de Analco stood on the site of an earlier pueblo, which he also called Analco:

The construction date of the "Oldest House" is unknown, but local legend claimed that the building was part of the Analco pueblo and was already standing when Spanish colonists arrived. An article from 1903 reported that it had been a tourist attraction "for fifty years", and it was said to be the oldest house in the United States as early as 1879. Even at the time, many were skeptical of this claim. In 1904, Charles Fletcher Lummis wrote (referring to the Maria Josefa bell supposedly cast in 1355):

The Tertio-Millennial Exposition was held in 1883, implying Santa Fe had been founded in 1550, which was inaccurate by 60 years. The organizers of the event promoted local tourist attractions like the "Oldest House" with very little regard for historical veracity. Later operators of the Oldest House have continued to claim a construction date as early as 1200. In 1992, the manager of the property admitted, "We have done no archaeological research. It is as much a legend, one of Santa Fe's many legends... I'm perpetuating the legend." However, there may be at least an element of truth to the claim that part of the building is of Puebloan origin. In 1902, Hewett inspected the walls while they were being repaired and noted a few sections that were constructed from 'puddled' adobe, a building technique used by Puebloans before the Spanish introduction of adobe bricks:

Based on this work, Hewett concluded that the majority of the building was probably of Spanish colonial origin, but may have been partially built on the foundation of an earlier Puebloan structure. Ralph E. Twitchell believed the building had a Pueblo connection as well:

Adolph Bandelier disputed the existence of the Analco pueblo and believed the house to have been constructed in the 1690s. A dendochronology study of the wooden vigas (ceiling beams) in the house reportedly showed they were cut between 1740 and 1767. In 1903, the house became part of St. Michael's College along with the neighboring San Miguel Mission and Lamy Building. At the time, the building was in disrepair:

The second story of the house was removed around the same time but was rebuilt in the 1920s, restoring the house to resemble its original appearance. It continues to operate as a tourist attraction, with the interior restored to an approximation of what it may have originally looked like.

Architecture
The De Vargas Street House is a two-story adobe building; the first floor is original and the second floor was reconstructed based on the original in the 1920s. Most of the house is constructed from adobe brick, which was a Spanish colonial technology, while a few lower wall sections are puddled adobe characteristic of pre-Spanish pueblo buildings. The first-floor ceiling is original and includes vigas dating to the mid-18th century. The first floor interior has two Spanish colonial-style rooms with corner fireplaces, while the second floor is "a dummy" and not open to visitors.

Gallery

See also
List of the oldest buildings in New Mexico

References

External links

 Santa Fe oldest house 
 Henry Whitfield Museum, Guildford, Ct.

Buildings and structures in Santa Fe, New Mexico
Adobe buildings and structures in New Mexico
Houses completed in 1646
Spanish-American culture in Santa Fe, New Mexico
Spanish Colonial architecture in New Mexico
1646 establishments in the Spanish Empire